Gigi Fernández and Arantxa Sánchez Vicario were the defending champions but only Sánchez Vicario competed that year with Manon Bollegraf.

Bollegraf and Sánchez Vicario lost in the quarterfinals to Lisa Raymond and Rennae Stubbs.

Martina Hingis and Helena Suková won in the final 6–1, 6–2 against Katrina Adams and Meredith McGrath.

Seeds
Champion seeds are indicated in bold text while text in italics indicates the round in which those seeds were eliminated.

 Lindsay Davenport /  Natasha Zvereva (semifinals)
 Manon Bollegraf /  Arantxa Sánchez Vicario (quarterfinals)
 Martina Hingis /  Helena Suková (champions)
 Yayuk Basuki /  Caroline Vis (first round)

Draw

External links
 1998 Sydney International Women's Doubles Draw

Women's Doubles
Doubles